Waverley is a historic home located near Morgantown, Charles County, Maryland. It is a large two story, five-bay, Flemish-bond brick house, that faces the Potomac River. All interior woodwork is characteristic of the Federal period.

It was listed on the National Register of Historic Places in 1975.

References

External links
 Home of Dr. Morgan A. Harris, complete description of attributes, construction details of home, photo from 1964.

Houses in Charles County, Maryland
Houses on the National Register of Historic Places in Maryland
Federal architecture in Maryland
Historic American Buildings Survey in Maryland
National Register of Historic Places in Charles County, Maryland